The Aston Martin Vantage GTE (also known as the Aston Martin Vantage AMR) is an endurance Grand Tourer developed by Aston Martin Racing, the motorsports arm of the British automobile manufacturer, Aston Martin. It is based on the 2018 Aston Martin Vantage, and is the successor of the Aston Martin Vantage GT2, and its later derivatives. The car was launched on the 22nd of November 2017, alongside its road-going counterpart in London. The car is noted to be capable of being converted from Group GTE specification to Group GT3 specification.

Development History 
The Aston Martin Vantage GTE was developed in tandem with the Vantage road car, between Aston Martin Racing and the Aston Martin headquarters in Gaydon, with the car being entirely developed in house by the two companies. The car had its initial shakedown in the UK, at the Rockingham Motor Speedway, and subsequently had 2 30 hour endurance tests during its development, at the Circuito de Andalucia and then the Circuito de Navarra in Spain during October 2017. This was also complemented by tests at the Sebring International Raceway in Florida, with the team praising the durability and reliability of the car. Ahead of its official World Endurance Championship debut, at the WEC Prologue held at the Circuit Paul Ricard , the car was revealed to have completed over 20,000 km in pre-season test, with testing being held at the Yas Marina Circuit in Abu Dhabi, Motorland Aragon, and the Algarve International Circuit.

At the 2019 24 Hours of Le Mans Test Day, the team debuted a new low-downforce kit, designed to reduce the overall drag on the car, due to the previous aerokit being a revised WEC Sprint kit, with Le Mans specific revisions. The kit was tested at Monza, and was found to be highly effective compared to the kit used at the 2018 edition of the race.

Competition History

2018-19 FIA World Endurance Championship 
The new cars were  struggling with tyre degradation, unable to keep the performance in their tyres through a double stint. The cars were putting too much energy and wear in the front tyres. This was caused by  the late decision to switch to Michelin.

GT Manufacturers FIA World Endurance Championship

2019-20 FIA World Endurance Championship

GT Manufacturers FIA World Endurance Championship

Endurance Trophy for LMGTE Am Teams

References List 



Vantage GTE
LM GTE cars
Sports racing cars